The Arabic word Haikal (also spelled Haykal), meaning temple, may refer to:

People
Abdulsalam Haykal (born 1978), Syrian entrepreneur and activist
Muhammad Haykal (disambiguation)
Mohamed Hassanein Heikal (1923–2016), Egyptian political journalist, writer and editor
Mohammed Hussein Heikal (1888–1956), Egyptian writer, politician, lawyer and former Minister of Education

Symbols
Haykal', a five-pointed star used as the official symbol of the Bahá'í Faith